Luiz Henrique Almeida de Lima (born 13 February 1984), known as Dick, is a Brazilian footballer who plays for Portuguesa SP as a defender.

Career statistics

References

External links

1984 births
Living people
Brazilian footballers
Association football defenders
Campeonato Brasileiro Série B players
Campeonato Brasileiro Série C players
Volta Redonda FC players
Nova Iguaçu Futebol Clube players
Associação Atlética Portuguesa (Santos) players
Sertãozinho Futebol Clube players
Joinville Esporte Clube players
Coritiba Foot Ball Club players
Veranópolis Esporte Clube Recreativo e Cultural players
Esporte Clube Pelotas players
América Futebol Clube (RN) players
Rio Branco Sport Club players
Clube Náutico Marcílio Dias players
Associação Desportiva Cabofriense players
Sociedade Esportiva e Recreativa Caxias do Sul players
Ituano FC players
Clube Atlético Bragantino players
Paraná Clube players
União Recreativa dos Trabalhadores players
Centro Sportivo Alagoano players
Associação Portuguesa de Desportos players